Negrophobia (also termed anti-Blackness) is characterized by a fear, hatred or extreme aversion to Black people and Cape Coloureds or Coloureds, and Black & Coloured culture worldwide. Caused amongst other factors by racism and traumatic events and circumstances, symptoms of this phobia include but are not limited to the attribution of negative characteristics to Black and Coloured people, the fear or the strong dislike of Black and Coloured men and the objectification of Black and Coloured women. 

People of mixed-race descent in South Africa are referred to as Coloureds or Cape Coloureds. This term includes individuals with a mixed-race descent that can include African, Asian, and European heritage. In South Africa, the term "Coloured" is considered neutral and is commonly used to refer to individuals who self-identify as such. However, in some Western countries, such as Britain and the United States of America the term "coloured" has a negative connotation and can be seen as derogatory because it was historically used as a means of categorizing black individuals and reinforcing racial hierarchies. 

The 1911 census in South Africa played a significant role in shaping racial identities within the country. The enumeration process involved specific instructions for classifying individuals into different racial categories, and the category of "coloured persons" was used to refer to all people of mixed race. This included various ethnic groups such as Hottentots, Bushmen, Cape Malays, Griquas, Korannas, Creoles, Negroes, and Cape Coloureds.

What's particularly noteworthy about the classification of "coloured persons" is that it included individuals of black African descent, commonly known as Negroes. As a result Coloureds or Cape Coloureds, as a group of mixed-race descent individuals, also have black African ancestry and can be considered part of the broader African diaspora.

The racial category of Coloureds is a multifaceted and heterogeneous group that exhibits great diversity. Analogously, they can be compared to the Black American population, which is composed of approximately 75% West African and 25% Northern European ancestry. However, the Cape Coloureds possess an even greater level of complexity due to the presence of Bantu African ancestry in their genetic makeup, which is closely linked to the West African heritage of Black Americans.

While Coloureds in South Africa do have black African ancestry, it is important to recognize that they have a distinct identity and experiences that are a bit different from those of black South Africans.

Despite this, there are instances where Coloureds may face discrimination and prejudice based on their mixed-race descent and black African ancestry. 

Furthermore, some individuals who hold prejudiced attitudes towards black people may also hold negative attitudes towards Coloureds, viewing them as inferior or less desirable due to their mixed-race heritage.

Definitions

Lexicology 

The hybrid word negrophobia consists of two components: negro and phobia. As such, it literally derives from "Fear of black":

 From Spanish and Portuguese: negro, "Black color" 
 From Greek: φόβος, phóbos, "Fear of"

Other terms with similar meanings include antiblackness and blackophobia. However, some publishers have discouraged designating individuals as blackophobes or negrophobes and rather highlight the general epithet that is usually applied to racists.

Although melanophobia is sometimes confused with negrophobia, the former term is more commonly applied to situations involving inanimate objects that are very dark or black. Negrophobia is also distinct from Afrophobia, which is a perceived fear of the various cultures and peoples of Africa and the African diaspora irrespective of their racial origin. Unlike negrophobia, Afrophobia is thus essentially a cultural rather than a racial phenomenon.

Debates over definitions

There are differences in the senses that are applied to negrophobes or the noun Negrophobia. Some senses use the term to describe a discriminatory sentiment towards people who may identify with the Black race. Accordingly, the latter sense adopts the notion that a person with Negrophobia believes that his or her race is superior to the Black race through xenophobia. However, an alternative definition stays true to the original clinical meaning of the suffix phobia. Thereby, Negrophobia would be associated not with racism, but rather with those who critically fear the Black race. In July 2010, a segment on Negrophobia was featured on The Rachel Maddow Show on MSNBC.

Overview

Historical context 

In Europe, Negrophobia finds its roots in the 17th century due to its extensive historical colonisation and slavery. According to certain sources, the term Negrophobia would have been forged on the model of the word Nigrophilism, itself first appearing in 1802 in Baudry des Lozières’s Les égarements du nigrophilisme. It further reappeared in January 1927 in Lamine Senghor’s La voix des nègres, a monthly anti-colonialist newspaper. The term was later popularised by Frantz Fanon, especially in his works Peaux noires masques blancs and ''Les Damnés de la Terre''. More recently in 2005, an anti-negrophobia brigade (BAN) was created in France to protest against increasing targeted acts and occurrences of police violence. The latter protest movements notably underwent severe police violence in the Jardin du Luxembourg in Paris during the 2011 and 2013 abolition of slavery commemorations.

Negrophobia and identity 

More specifically on Fanon's analysis of Negrophobia, the psychiatrist was the first to introduce the concept of Black Negrophobia, pointing to the hatred of Black people and Black culture by Black people themselves. Indeed, he asserts that Negrophobia is a form of "trauma for white people of the Negro". Equivalent to internalised racism caused by the trauma of living in a culture defining Black people as inherently evil, Fanon emphasises the slight existing cultural intricacies caused by the vast diversity of Black people and cultures, as well as the nature of their colonisation by White Europeans. The symptoms of such Black Negrophobia include a rejection of their native or ethnic language in favour of European languages, a marked preference for European cultures over Black cultures, and a tendency to surround themselves with lighter skinned people rather than darker skinned ones. Similarly, the pattern further includes attributing negative characteristics to Black people, culture, and things. Toni Morrison's novel The Bluest Eye (1970) stands as an illustrative work on the destroying effects of Negrophobia among the Black community on themselves. Indeed, the main character, Pecola Breedlove, through her non-reconciliation with her Black identity, her Black societal indifference and her craving for symbolic blue eyes, presents all the signs of an internalised Negrophobia. She develops an anti-Black neurosis due to her feeling of non-existence both within the White and her own community.

While the latter theoretical framework is academically debated, Fanon insists on the nature of Negrophobia as a socio-diagnosis, thus characterising not individuals but rather entire societies and their patterns. Fanon thereby implies that Negrophobia is a cross-disciplinary area of research, justifying that its analysis and understanding may not be confined to the psychological field.

Negrophobia and law 

The notion of involuntary Negrophobia is highly debated in the academic and legal arenas, specifically opposing non instrumentalists and instrumentalists. The formers are favourable to the involuntary nature of a post-traumatic stress disorder, thereby defending the uncontrollable nature of a defendant’s actions. This approach focusses on the personal culpability of the individual defendant, thus disregarding any possible social implications. On the other hand, instrumentalists do consider such broader implications, viewing the law as an object of social change and claiming to promote the general welfare by refusing to recognise legal claims damaging the integrity of the legal. This view criticises non instrumentalists for equating Negrophobia with insanity by allowing a person’s racial fear to legally justify and even excuse violent behaviour. Following widespread claims that sane but guilty defendants may exploit the insanity defence to escape long prison sentences, a similar skepticism with respect to defences invoking Negrophobia would result in significant distrust in the legal and criminal justice system, thereby indirectly destroying the legitimacy of such courts.

Anti-Blackness in Education and Organization Studies. 
In response to Black Lives Matter organizing contemporary scholars of Education, Human Resource Development, and Critical Management Studies have begun focusing on anti-Blackness in schools and places of business. These efforts build on established critical race discourses in their respective field and incorporate concepts from Afropessimism.

See also

 Negrophilia
 Afrophobia
 Missing white woman syndrome
 Ethnocentrism
 List of phobias
 Racial bias in criminal news
 Racism against African Americans
 Stereotypes of African Americans
 Xenophobia

References

Prejudice and discrimination by type
Anti-black racism